Stegonotus cucullatus, or the slaty-grey snake, is a species of snake in the family Colubridae. The snake is found in Northern Territory and Queensland, Australia, and in New Guinea.

References

Colubrids
Reptiles described in 1854
Taxa named by André Marie Constant Duméril
Taxa named by Gabriel Bibron
Taxa named by Auguste Duméril
Snakes of Australia
Snakes of New Guinea